The Bank of Ensley, at 19th St. and Ave. E in Birmingham, Alabama, was built in 1918.  It was listed on the National Register of Historic Places in 1984.

The bank was organized in 1899 and was the first bank in the western section of Birmingham.  Three years after this building was built, the president and vice-president sold the business to a vice president and a former cashier.  The bank "flourished" through the 1920s, but failed on January 10, 1930.

The building, designed by local architect H.O. Breeding, is Classical Revival in style.

References

Bank buildings on the National Register of Historic Places in Alabama
National Register of Historic Places in Jefferson County, Alabama
Neoclassical architecture in Alabama
Commercial buildings completed in 1918